Shane Legg  is a machine learning research director and digital technology entrepreneur who did an AI-related postdoctoral fellowship at University College London's Gatsby Computational Neuroscience Unit, after doctoral work at the  Istituto Dalle Molle di Studi sull'Intelligenza Artificiale  (IDSIA, Dalle Molle Institute for Artificial Intelligence Research) working on theoretical models of super-intelligent machines under Marcus Hutter. He left academia to join Demis Hassabis and Mustafa Suleyman in cofounding the human and artificial intelligence-focused startup, DeepMind Technologies, which was acquired by Google in 2014. As of August 2022, Legg remained at Google's DeepMind subsidiary, in the role of Chief Scientist.

Early life and education
Legg attended Rotorua Lakes High School in Rotorua, on New Zealand's North Island. He completed his undergraduate studies at Waikato University. He obtained his MSc degree with a thesis entitled "Solomonoff Induction", with Cristian S. Calude at the University of Auckland. 

He did his PhD work at the   Istituto Dalle Molle di Studi sull'Intelligenza Artificiale  (IDSIA), an joint affiliate of the Università della Svizzera italiana (USI, University of Lugano) and  Scuola universitaria professionale della Svizzera italiana (SUPSI, University of Applied Sciences of Southern Switzerland), working on theoretical models of super intelligent machines (AIXI) with Marcus Hutter; his doctoral thesis entitled "Machine Super Intelligence" was completed in 2008. He then went on to complete a postdoctoral fellowship in finance at USI, and began a further fellowship at University College London's Gatsby Computational Neuroscience Unit.

Research interests

Legg's main research interests are in artificial intelligence, in both theory and practice. In particular, he is interested in measures of intelligence for machines, neural networks, artificial evolution, reinforcement learning and the theory of learning. He has worked on these topics in both commercial and academic environments.

Career
After Legg's academic years—where the fellowship positions, while still having elements of training, can be viewed as his first career positions—he at first went onto "a number of software development positions at private companies", including the "big data firm Adaptive Intelligence".

DeepMind Technologies

Founding
In 2010, Legg cofounded the start-up DeepMind Technologies along with Demis Hassabis and Mustafa Suleyman. Hassabis and Legg first met at UCL's Gatsby Computational Neuroscience Unit, where Legg was a research associate.

Achievements

Legg's achievements at DeepMind have included many productive, ongoing projects, and regarding these, company reports and publications arising from the project developmentand staff oversight doing the applied industrial AI research that is the companies focus.

Roles

As of August 2022, Legg remained at Google's DeepMind subsidiary, in the role of Chief Scientist.

Awards and honors

Legg was appointed Commander of the Order of the British Empire (CBE) in the 2019 Birthday Honours for services to the science and technology sector and to investment.

It has been reported in an introduction to an email interview at a self-published blog site that Legg was awarded the $10,000 prize of the Canadian Singularity Institute for Artificial Intelligence for his PhD dissertation.

References

Living people
Machine learning researchers
Artificial intelligence researchers
New Zealand expatriates in England
University of Waikato alumni
University of Auckland alumni
Year of birth missing (living people)
Commanders of the Order of the British Empire